Clare Lockhart is Director and co-founder of the Institute for State Effectiveness (ISE). ISE was founded in 2005 to find and promote approaches to building good governance. Lockhart is also Director of the Market Building Initiative at the Aspen Institute, and a Senior Fellow at the Jackson Institute for Global Affairs at Yale University.

She served in Afghanistan as an adviser to the United Nations during the Bonn Process in 2001. Lockhart is an Advisory Board Member of Spirit of America, a 501(c)(3) organization that supports the safety and success of Americans serving abroad and the local people and partners they seek to help.

Education
She is a member of the Bar of England and Wales, and was educated at the University of Oxford and Harvard University.

Publications
She is the coauthor with Ashraf Ghani of Fixing Failed States: A Framework for Rebuilding a Fractured World (2008). Along with Ashraf Ghani, she was listed on the 'Top 100 global thinkers list' for 2010 by Foreign Policy.

References

External links

Year of birth missing (living people)
Living people
Place of birth missing (living people)
Alumni of the University of Oxford
Harvard Kennedy School alumni
Members of the Bar of England and Wales
British barristers
British chief executives
British non-fiction writers
The Asia Foundation